The men's triple jump event  at the 1989 European Athletics Indoor Championships was held on 18 February.

Results

References

Triple jump at the European Athletics Indoor Championships
Triple